Mariana Simionescu (born 27 November 1956) is a retired tennis player from Romania.

Career

Simionescu won the French Junior Championships in 1974. She played on the WTA Tour from 1973 to 1980. Her best Grand Slam performance was reaching the fourth round at Wimbledon in 1977. She won one singles title and one doubles title. She reached a career-high singles ranking of world no. 36 in 1978.

Simionescu married Björn Borg on 24 July 1980, but the marriage ended in 1984. She never remarried, but lived with former F1 racer J.-L. Schlesser for a few years, with whom she has a son (Anthony).

WTA Tour finals

Singles: 2 (1–1)

Doubles: 4 (1–3)

Grand Slam singles tournament timeline

Note: The Australian Open was held twice in 1977, in January and December.

References

External links 

 
 
 

1956 births
Living people
French Open junior champions
Grand Slam (tennis) champions in girls' singles
People from Târgu Neamț
Romanian female tennis players